Gwyneth Strong (born 2 December 1959) is an English actress. She has appeared in Shadows (1975), Angels (1976), Crown Court and Z-Cars (1977), Play for Today (1980-1984), Silent Witness (1996). However, she is best known for her role as Cassandra, the love interest and, later, wife of Rodney (Nicholas Lyndhurst), in Only Fools and Horses (1989-2003), and for playing Geraldine Clough in seven episodes of EastEnders in 2016.

Career
Strong's first acting appearance was in the Royal Court Theatre's production Live Like Pigs, when she was 13. In 1973, whilst a pupil at Holland Park School, she appeared in the horror film Nothing but the Night as Mary Valley and had a role as Princess Dagmar, younger sister of the Princess of Wales, later Queen Alexandra, in the series Edward the Seventh. 

She was a regular in the children's TV series The Flockton Flyer between 1977 and 1979 as Jan Carter. Another of her early television appearances came in 1982 when she appeared as Carol Dalston in the Minder episode "Poetic Justice, Innit?".

Strong gained mainstream recognition as Cassandra Parry, the love interest and later wife of Rodney Trotter in Only Fools and Horses, debuting in the series' sixth season. She also appeared in the "Observation" segment about detective Samantha Smith made for the 1990 series of The Krypton Factor, the two-part drama serial The Missing Postman as WPC Rachel McMahon, the BBC drama Real Women from 1997 to 1998, as Hetty in ITV's Lucy Sullivan Is Getting Married (1999) and in BBC drama Casualty in 2003 as Jim Brodie's wife Elizabeth.

Strong was featured in the television film It's a Lovely Day Tomorrow (1975), written by Bernard Kops and directed by John Goldschmidt, depicting the real-life drama of the Bethnal Green tube disaster in World War II. She also appeared in the "True Confessions" two-part episode of the series A Touch of Frost, reuniting her on screen with her Only Fools and Horses costar David Jason.

She appeared on the West End stage in 2008 in the musical Our House, in which she played Kath Casey. In May 2010, Strong appeared in Midsomer Murders “The Made-to-Measure Murders” as Katie Soper. In 2011, Strong joined the cast of A Round-Heeled Woman at the Aldwych Theatre.

In September 2016, she joined the cast of the BBC soap opera EastEnders, in the recurring role of Geraldine Clough, a rival darts player against the Queen Vic.

Personal life
Strong was a child actress. Her parents were both in the industry, her father a director, her mother in production at the BBC. Strong married her longterm partner, former Footballers' Wives and Eldorado star Jesse Birdsall, in 2000. They have a son, Oscar (born 1988), and a daughter, Lottie (born 1991). Strong also has two grandchildren. She is patron of the charity Ovarian Cancer Action.

Filmography

Film

Television

Theatre work
 Live Like Pigs: Royal Court Theatre (1973) 
 Our House (2008) 
 Alarms & Excursions (2011)
 A Round-Heeled Woman: Aldwych Theatre (2011)
 The Mousetrap: On tour (2019)

References

External links
 

1959 births
Living people
English soap opera actresses
English stage actresses
English television actresses
People educated at Holland Park School
British comedy actresses
Actresses from London